is a Japanese manga series written and illustrated by the manga artist Osamu Tezuka. Tezuka's childhood memory of his friends pronouncing  as dororo inspired the title of the series. Dororo was first serialized in Shogakukan's Weekly Shōnen Sunday between August 1967 and July 1968, before being cancelled. The manga was then concluded in Akita Shoten's Bōken'ō magazine in 1969.

A 26-episode anime television series adaptation produced by Mushi Productions aired in 1969. The anime series bears the distinction of being the first entry in what is now known as the World Masterpiece Theater series (Calpis Comic Theater at the time). Dororo was also made into a live-action film in 2007. A 24-episode second anime television series adaptation by MAPPA and Tezuka Productions aired from January to June 2019.

Plot
Dororo revolves around a rōnin named  and young orphaned thief named  during the Sengoku period. The rōnin was born malformed, limbless and without facial features or internal organs. This was the result of his birth father daimyō Kagemitsu Daigō forging a pact with 48 sealed demons so that he might rule the land and increase its wealth and prosperity. In return, he promised the demons anything that they wanted which belonged to him. This enabled them to roam free and commit atrocities along the countryside.

After his mother Nui no Kata was forced to set him adrift on the river, lest he be killed by his father, the infant was subsequently found and raised by Jukai, a medicine man who used healing magic and alchemist methods to give the child prostheses crafted from the remains of children who had died in the war. The boy became nearly invincible against any mortal blow as a result of the prostheses and healing magic. Grafted into his left arm was a very special blade that a traveling storyteller presented to Jukai, believing it was fated to be within his possession given that ever since the boy had been discovered, the doctor had been visited by goblins. As revealed in a short tale about the blade's origin, the blade had been forged out of vengeance to kill goblins as well as other supernatural entities.

After the sensei was forced to send him on his way because he was attracting demons, the young man learned from a ghostly voice of the curse that had been set upon him at birth and that by killing the demons responsible he could reclaim the stolen pieces of his body and thus regain his humanity. Across his travels, he earned the name  among other names for his inhuman nature. On one such hunt of a demon, Hyakkimaru came across a young orphan thief named Dororo who thereafter travels by his side through the war-torn countryside. When Hyakkimaru met Dororo, he had already killed 15 demons.

Throughout their journey, Hyakkimaru killed six more demons, bringing the total to 21. Along the way, Hyakkimaru learns that Dororo was hiding a big secret. Dororo's father, Bandit Hibukuro, hid money he saved up on his raids on Bone Cape to later be distributed to the people squeezed dry by the samurai. Itachi, a bandit who betrayed Hibukuro and sided with the authorities, crippled Hibukuro. Hibukuro escaped with limping legs, along with his wife and young child. Hibukuro dies trying to let his remaining family escape. Fearing that she, too, will die, Ojyui had prayed to Buddha and, with her blood, drew the map that will lead him to Bone Cape. Three days later, she froze to death.

Itachi kidnapped Dororo and used the map on "his" back to lead them to Bone Cape. A mysterious boatman ferried them to the Cape but he had two demon sharks with him. One of the sharks ate half of Itachi's bandits while the other shark left with the boatman. However, Dororo and the remaining bandits managed to kill the shark. When the boatman and the second shark returned, Dororo was able to separate the boatman and the shark. Hyakkimaru arrived to stab the shark in one of its eyes, but It escaped. They held the boatman prisoner and then they landed on Bone Cape.

The boatman told the thirsty bandits of a spring not too far from their camp, and they went to drink, leaving Itachi, Dororo, the boatman and Hyakkimaru. Dororo later found their corpses and blood leading to the half-blind shark. Hyakkimaru killed the shark and the boatman, then recovered his real voice. Itachi went to search for the money but only found a letter from Hibukuro saying that he hid it somewhere else. The Magistrate arrived under the pretense of getting rid of the bandits but actually came for the treasure. Hyakkimaru, Dororo, and Itachi kill them, but Itachi was left for dead. Hyakkimaru and Dororo continued on their journey.

Sometime later Hyakkimaru learns that his father, Kagemitsu Daigo, was possessed by the 48 demons, and went to slay him. Things were going badly on the Daigo clan's land, and the citizens were forced to build a fort for him. The slaves were planning a rebellion, but one of the slaves told Kagemitsu of their plans, and he was prepared. His archers shot and killed many slaves and the remainder hid in a tunnel they had built under the fort.

Hyakkimaru left Dororo and ran into the fort. Dororo joined the slaves in their ambush, but Kagemitsu Daigo's soldiers caught Dororo. To prove his loyalty, Kagemitsu told Hyakkimaru to kill Dororo. Hyakkimaru acted as if he was about to kill Dororo but turned around and threw his sword into the dark stabbing the physical manifestation of the 48 demons, however, some of them managed to escape. The slaves charged through the tunnel and attacked Kagemitsu's soldiers. Kagemitsu, weak because of the slain demons, escaped with his wife Nui.

After he regained his eyes, Hyakkimaru figured out that Dororo is female, though Dororo rejects the notion and refers to himself as a boy despite Hyakkimaru's insistence to act more feminine. This is in part due to Dororo being raised as a boy by his parents in order to be tough. Hyakkimaru also wanted Dororo to fight with the farmers against those in power because Dororo's father was a farmer. Hyakkimaru gave his sword to Dororo, the one that he had desired throughout the series. Hyakkimaru planned to continue his journey alone, agreeing to meet Dororo again when Hyakkimaru's body was whole. They parted with Dororo crying at the doors. It was not until 20 years later that the last of the 48 demons was slain, and he reunited with the full-grown Dororo.

Characters
Characters and voice actors appearing in the anime and video game.

 

 (video game)
Hyakkimaru is a 16 year-old, rōnin during the Sengoku period and the eldest son of Lord Kagemitsu Daigo and Lady Nui no Kata. Due to a pact forged by his father with 48 sealed demons, the unnamed baby was born malformed, limbless and without facial features or internal organs. The infant was set adrift in the river and was subsequently found and raised by Dr. Jukai who gave the mute child prostheses including special blades grafted into his hard-clay arms forged out of vengeance to kill supernatural entities and regain his true human body. The boy became nearly invincible as a result of the prostheses and nearly heightened senses as he regains each part of his body. During his travels, he earned the name "Hyakkimaru" among other names for his inhuman nature, such as "Dororo" whom he had given to the orphan "boy" he befriends and journeys with to fulfill his quest in rightfully becoming whole. Biwaru, in the closing scenes, alludes that Hyakkimaru and Dororo do end up romantically involved.

 (video game)
Dororo is an 11 year-old, thief who joins Hyakkimaru in his travels and adventures. For the better part of the series the viewer is led to believe Dororo is male. In the original manga and 1969 anime adaptation, Hyakkimaru learns that Dororo is female; with the latter freaking-out if Hyakkimaru knows (in the 2019 anime it is revealed early on, though Hyakkimaru makes no note of it. Due to his soulsight, it is doubtful he knows what gender is). Dororo did not receive the classical education that most girls would have received, pertinent to the era (some form of the Onna-Daigaku). Dororo’s mother was the only other female in her formative years. Dororo adopted the masculine speech-pattern (rude and abrasive) and ambling-stances of the bandits around her. Dororo's bandit father, Hibukuro, was wounded by a samurai official (in the 2019 anime he is betrayed by his 2nd-in-command, Itachi) and later died. Dororo’s mother, Ojiya, froze to death while fleeing in the snow (she dies of starvation in the 2019 anime), but before she died she drew a map on Dororo's back to locate money hidden by "his" brigand father at Bone Cape. This tattoo only appears when her back is warmed. She learns of it while in an Onsen. Years later, she reunites with a fully human Hyakkimaru as a lovely young woman, wearing the same color scheme as her deceased mother. It is implied they are betrothed by Biwaru.

 (video game)
Hyakkimaru's father and Samurai in the Muromachi period, Lord of Ishikawa and vassal to the governor of Kaga Province. So that he might rule the land and protect it from the repeated famines, epidemics, droughts and disasters that plagued neighboring domains, he forged a pact with 48 sealed demons where each could obtain a piece of his newborn child's body.

 (video game)
 Younger brother of Hyakkimaru and the second son of Kagemitsu Daigo. Born after Hyakkimaru was abandoned. At first, he cares about morality and the sins committed to his older brother, but quickly changes his mind when he realizes that the prosperity is reliant upon Hyakkimaru’s suffering. In their first duel, Hyakkimaru escapes by slicing Tahomaru’s right eye in a riposte (it is doubtful Hyakkimaru did this on purpose, as he was greatly outnumbered and trying to find cover). After this battle, Tahomaru because much more coldhearted and trains relentlessly to accommodate his missing eye and changed depth perception.

 (video game)
A skilled doctor and surgeon who used healing magic and alchemical methods to create prostheses for the child who became Hyakkimaru.

An unnamed blind travelling monk and a biwa hōshi (lute priest). He is an excellent swordsman who carries a sword inside his biwa. He is the narrator in the 2019 anime. He is given the name Biwaru in the 2019 anime.

 (video game)
Hyakkimaru's first love, a beautiful young woman who took care of orphaned children. They met shortly after Hyakkimaru regains his hearing. She sings a lot and her voice is the only thing he can tolerate until he gets used to all the new noises. She gained food and money by prostituting herself to the two armies. Dororo finds this out by following her one night. She died protecting the other children from a raid ordered by Kagemitsu. In the manga and first anime she dies before the action starts and therefore is seen only in flashbacks, but in the 2019 anime she shows up in the present. In the 2019 anime, Kagemitsu’ scouts find her going in and out of the rival camp and assume she is a spy. Hyakkimaru is unable to defend them because he was a returning from killing a demon.

 

A bandit and 2nd-in-command, who betrayed Dororo's father Hibukuro and sided with the authorities. He later kidnapped Dororo to get the map to find the money hidden by Hibukuro. He was about a day behind Ojiya and Dororo, when she the first died in a red lily field. He found her shallow grave and dug it up, to get to her back tattoo. He was eventually betrayed himself, used as bait by his lord, and accepts what Hibukuro always said: The nobles do not care about them. He and a few other samurai survive and return to a life of brigands, looking for Dororo and the treasure.

A puppy wearing a hat that travels with Hyakkimaru. Original anime character only and does not appear in the manga. Makes a cameo appearance in the first episode of the 2019 anime.

Media

Manga
Dororo was first serialized in Weekly Shōnen Sunday between August 27, 1967, and July 22, 1968, before being cancelled. Parallel to the anime broadcast, the manga was then moved and concluded in Akita Shoten's Bōken Ō magazine from May to October 1969. Akita Shoten published the manga in four tankōbon volumes between August 12, 1971, and May 20, 1972. As part of its Osamu Tezuka Manga Complete Works edition, Kodansha compiled the manga into four volumes published between March 12 and June 12, 1981. Akita Shoten republished the manga in a three-volume deluxe edition between August 23 and October 18, 1990, and a new three-volume bunkobon edition under its Akita Bunko imprint on March 28, 1994. On November 11, 2009, Kodansha published the series in a two-volume edition.

In 2008, Vertical Inc. released an English translation of Dororo in three volumes, published between April 29 and August 26. In 2009, it won the Eisner Award in the "Best U.S. Edition of International Material—Japan" division. In 2012, Vertical republished the manga in a single volume edition on March 20.

On November 2, 2012, a manga crossover one-shot was published featuring Dororo and Dororon Enma-kun'''s Emma. In 2013, it was expanded into a full series,

From 2018 to 2020, a manga reinterpretation of Dororo, illustrated by Atsushi Kaneko, set in a futuristic, apocalyptic world with the main characters gender-swapped, titled Search and Destroy, was published by Micro Magazine's TezuComi. Its chapters were collected in three volumes.

A remake manga illustrated by Satoshi Shiki, titled , started in Akita Shoten's Champion Red on October 19, 2018. In May 2021, it was announced that the series entered its last arc. The first tankōbon volume was published on April 19, 2019. As of February 18, 2022, six volumes have been released. In North America, the manga has been licensed by Seven Seas Entertainment, and the first volume was released on June 9, 2020.

Novels
A novel written by Masaki Tsuji and illustrated by Hideki Kitano was published by Asahi Sonorama in September 1978; it was later reprinted in January 2007.

Film

A live action film directed by Akihiko Shiota was released in 2007.

Anime

The first anime series was broadcast between April and September 1969. Unlike the manga, the anime version has a conclusive ending. In 2008, Anime Sols began a crowd-funding project for official streaming of the show. Funding for the first half of the show reached its goal, and the funding continued for the second half. However, Anime Sols folded, and Discotek Media picked up the project and released it on DVD in 2016, including the show's color pilot in the set.

A 24-episode second anime television series adaptation by MAPPA and Tezuka Productions was announced in March 2018. The series aired from January 7 to June 24, 2019 through Amazon. The anime aired on Tokyo MX, BS11, and Jidaigeki Senmon Channel. Kazuhiro Furuhashi directs the series, with Yasuko Kobayashi handling series composition, Satoshi Iwataki handling character designs, and Yoshihiro Ike composing the music. Twin Engine produces the series. The first opening theme  is performed by Queen Bee, while the first ending theme  is performed by Amazarashi. The second opening  is performed by Asian Kung-Fu Generation and the second ending theme  is performed by Eve. On March 31, 2021, it was announced Sentai Filmworks has licensed the anime for home video release and will produce an English dub for the series.

Video game

Developer Sega made a Dororo-based video game for the PlayStation 2 console in 2004. It was released in the United States and Europe under the title Blood Will Tell. The game's artwork was done by renowned manga artist Hiroaki Samura. Dororo was not very successful commercially or critically, scoring a 69% average at GameRankings.

See also

List of Osamu Tezuka anime
List of Osamu Tezuka manga
Osamu Tezuka's Star System

References

External links
 Dororo at Tezuka Osamu @ World — Official site for Tezuka Osamu's works
 Official Dororo Page at publisher Vertical, Inc.
 TVアニメ「どろろ」公式サイト (Japanese) Official Dororo'' Anime 2019 Page
 

1967 manga
2018 manga
Action anime and manga
Akita Shoten manga
Dark fantasy anime and manga
Demons in anime and manga
Eisner Award winners
Fiction about curses
Historical fantasy anime and manga
Manga adapted into films
Osamu Tezuka manga
Seven Seas Entertainment titles
Shogakukan manga
Shōnen manga
Vertical (publisher) titles
Yōkai in anime and manga